The Indian Nation was an independent nationalist daily newspaper published by Newspaper & Publications Pvt. Ltd. from Patna, capital of Bihar state, India. The newspaper started publication in 1931. The publication was briefly suspended in 1932 and was resumed in 1943. It was owned by Maharaja of Darbhanga, Maharja Sir Kameshwar Singh.

The Indian Nation virtually held a monopoly in English-language newspapers published in Bihar until the mid-1980s. However, its sales declined due to competition from The Times of India, the Hindustan Times, and other newspapers. Problems were further aggravated by use of old technology in printing, labour union problems, and financial problems. During the 1990s, its publication continued intermittently. The Indian Nation ceased publication in the late 1990s.

Upendra Acharya of Indian Nation was also President of the Indian Newspaper Society (INS) during 1958–1959.

The Aryavarta used to be the Indian Nation's Hindi edition. Most prominent editor of Aryavarta was Shri Braj Kishore Jha Bhaskar. This group also published a Maithili periodical called Mithila Mihir.

References

Further reading 
 History of Indian National Congress, 1885–2002, page 258, by Deep Chand Bandhu
 Political economy and class contradictions: a study By Jose J. Nedumpara, page 128

English-language newspapers published in India
Defunct newspapers published in India
Publications established in 1931
Mass media in Bihar
Organisations based in Bihar
1931 establishments in India